Jubb Ramlah Subdistrict  is a Syrian nahiyah (subdistrict) located in Masyaf District in Hama.  According to the Syria Central Bureau of Statistics (CBS), Jubb Ramlah Subdistrict had a population of 39,814 in the 2004 census.

References 

Jubb Ramlah
Masyaf District